City of Stormreach is a supplement to the 3.5 edition of the Dungeons & Dragons role-playing game.

Contents
City of Stormreach is an accessory for the Eberron setting that describes the shadowy ruins, sinister organizations, and treasure-laden dungeons that make Stormreach such an appealing destination for player characters. In addition to providing Dungeon Masters with a richly detailed city for their Xen'drik based campaigns, this supplement presents information on the movers and shakers of Stormreach, ready-to-use adversaries, adventure hooks, and location maps.

Publication history
City of Stormreach was written by Keith Baker, Nicolas Logue, James "Grim" Desborough, and C.A. Suleiman, and published in February 2008. Cover art was by Steve Prescott, with interior art by David Esbrí, Tomás Giorello, Ron Lemen, William O'Connor, Lucio Parrillo, Steve Prescott, Francis Tsai, Franz Vohwinkel, Kieran Yanner, and James Zhang.

Reception

External links
product info

References

Eberron supplements
Role-playing game supplements introduced in 2008